Arkansas Territory's at-large congressional district was the congressional district for the Arkansas Territory. The Arkansas Territory was created on July 4, 1819, from a portion of the Missouri Territory. It existed until Arkansas was admitted to the Union on June 15, 1836.

List of delegates representing the district

References 

 Election Statistics 1920-present Clerk of the House of Representatives
 
 
 Congressional Biographical Directory of the United States 1774–present
 

Former congressional districts of the United States
Territory